The Avatime are an Akan people who live in Volta region of Ghana. History has it that they are Ahanta people who migrated to the Volta region.

References

Ethnic groups in Ghana